The 2005–06 FA Women's Premier League season was the 15th season of the FA Women's Premier League.

National Division
The season started on 14 August 2005 and ended on 14 May 2006. Arsenal were the defending champions, while Sunderland and Chelsea entered as the promoted teams from the 2004–05 Northern and Southern Divisions. Bristol Rovers changed their name to Bristol Academy to reflect the added investment and commitment of the Bristol Academy of Sport. Arsenal won their third consecutive league title, and eight overall. The National Division was expanded from 10 to 12 clubs ahead of the 2006–07 season.

Playoffs

No relegations.

Top goalscorers
.

Northern Division
The season started on 14 August 2005 and ended on 14 May 2006. Oldham Curzon changed their name to Curzon Ashton.

Top goalscorers
.

Southern Division
The season started on 14 August 2005 and ended on 7 May 2006. Reading Royals were affiliated with Reading until May 2006. Cardiff City qualified for the European Cup by winning the Welsh Women's Cup.

Top goalscorers
.

References

External links
RSSSF

Eng
FA Women's National League seasons
Wom
2005–06 in English women's football